Bawang Merah Bawang Putih (English translation: Garlic and Red Onion) is a sinetron of Indonesia, produced by MD Entertainment. This is a modernized adaptation of "Garlic and Onion" (Bawang Merah Bawang Putih), an ancient Indo-Malayan fairy tale that corresponds with the story of Cinderella. The soap opera stars: Revalina S. Temat, Dimaz Andrean, Nia Ramadhani, Lydia Kandou, Dwi Yan, Helsi Herlinda, Nena Rosier, Nana Khairina, Ully Artha, Ade Irawan, Elsye Virgita, and Marsha Aruan. The soap opera aired on RCTI between 2004 and 2006. It won a Panasonic Awards as Favorite Drama Series Program in 2005. All 108 episodes of the soap opera were also popular in Malaysia when TV3 aired it from 2006 to early 2007 and reruns on local channel TVRI Jawa Barat in West Java.

From late February 2013 until mid May 2014, KGMB and KHNL will simulcast and air Bawang Merah Bawang Putih in Hawaiian so the title of this show is called in Hawaii as Pele a me Hi'iaka (Pele and Hi'iaka) every Thursday and Friday night at 6:30pm, replacing Entertainment Tonight (KHNL) and The Insider (KGMB).

Cast
Revalina S. Temat as Alya/Bawang Putih
Dimaz Andrean as Ferdy
Nia Ramadhani as Siska/Bawang Merah
Lydia Kandou as Jasmine
Dwi Yan as Indra
Helsi Herlinda as Rika Sumanto
Nena Rosier as Putri Cahaya
Nana Khairina as Putri Hitam
Ully Artha as Ratu Jahat
Dude Herlino as Joe
Rifky Alhabsyi as Andre
Ade Irawan as Bertha
Elsye Virgita as Irma
Marsha Aruan as Olivia
Coreana Agashi as Tia
Ade Moura as Lani
Visensia Nyssa Yuliani as Rita
Tizza Radia as Jenny
Meidian Maladi as Jodie

Synopsis
The story of Bawang Merah Bawang Putih unfolds in the present day, but takes a moral message from the original, famous Indonesian folktale; Bawang Merah Bawang Putih.

Bawang Merah Bawang Putih is about two pretty girls, who are neighbors and study at the same school. Alya is a diligent student who plays the character of Bawang Putih in the opera of Bawang Merah Bawang Putih, while Siska plays Bawang Merah. They are known as Bawang Merah and Bawang Putih in their school because the opera was a big success. Both teenagers have their own circle of friends. Siska lives with her mother, Rika, who is divorced from her father. Her father is in jail because of corruption, so they live in affliction. Alya lives happily with her parents. Her father Indra, is a successful businessman, while Yasmin, her mother, is a friendly housewife.

Siska's character as Bawang Merah in the opera continues in her life. Bawang Merah and her mother are jealous of Bawang Putih's life. Rika and Siska are very good at acting so Alya and her mother don't realize that Siska and her mother resent them.

When Ferdy, a new student, falls in love with Bawang Putih, Siska starts to hate Bawang Putih more each day. Ferdy actually comes from a rich family, but he ran away from home and lives simply in Jakarta, because he cannot stand his father who is very strict. Bawang Merah tries to separate Freddy and Bawang Putih constantly. While, Rika also tries to destroy Jasmine's family. Rika acts so good that Yasmin treats her not as a neighbor, but as a sister. Yasmin always helps her, especially when it comes to money.

Finally, Rika has a chance to poison Jasmine, and she dies. Before her death, she gets the chance to tell her daughter to be careful of Rika, but Bawang Putih gets the message wrong. She thinks that her mother asks her to take Rika into her life after her mother died. Rika keeps trying to win Indra until finally they get married and she moves into his house with her daughter. After this, Bawang Putih lives in agony and suffering. But her agony doesn't make her change. She takes her suffering with patience so God blesses her.

She makes friends with a fairy that no one can see. There is no eternal crime. Goodness finally overcomes evil. Finally Bawang Putih lives happily, while Bawang Merah and her mother pay for their past actions.

Awards and nominations

References

Indonesian drama television series
2004 Indonesian television series debuts
2006 Indonesian television series endings
2000s Indonesian television series
RCTI original programming